Jason Victor Smith (born March 2, 1986) is an American former professional basketball player. He played college basketball for Colorado State University before being selected with the 20th overall pick in the 2007 NBA draft by the Miami Heat.

High school career
Smith attended Platte Valley High School in Kersey, Colorado where he was regarded as the state's premier prep player during his senior season in 2003–04. He was a two-time state player of the year, was named to the All-Colorado team as a junior and senior, was a three-year letterwinner and starter for the Broncos, was named to all-conference and all-state teams three times, and was selected as most outstanding player in state Class 3A tournament as a senior.

College career
As a freshman at Colorado State in 2004–05, Smith was named the Mountain West Freshman of the Year and earned all-MWC honorable mention honors. In 26 games (11 starts), he averaged 10.5 points on 55.4 percent shooting (103-of-186) with 5.8 rebounds, 1.7 assists and 1.4 blocked shots in 24.4 minutes per game.

As a sophomore in 2005–06, Smith played in and started all 31 games for the Rams, and the season's end, he earned first-team All-Mountain West and second-team NABC all-district honors. On the season, he averaged 16.2 points on 51.7 percent shooting (178-of-344) with 7.3 rebounds, 2.3 assists and 2.1 blocked shots in 28.7 minutes per game.

As a junior in 2006–07, Smith earned first-team All-Mountain West honors for a second straight year after he led the MWC in rebounding (10.1 rpg, ranked ninth nationally) and ranked sixth in scoring (16.8 ppg).

On April 3, 2007, Smith declared for the NBA draft, forgoing his final year of college eligibility. He left Colorado State ranking ninth on the school's all-time leading scoring list with 1,281 points. He also ranked sixth in rebounds (683) and fifth in blocked shots (149), while his 24 career double-doubles was the second-most in school history.

Professional career

Philadelphia 76ers (2007–2010)

Smith was selected by the Miami Heat with the 20th overall pick in the 2007 NBA draft, but was later traded to the Philadelphia 76ers on draft night. As a rookie with the 76ers, Smith averaged 4.5 points and 3.0 rebounds in 76 games. In August 2008, he tore the anterior cruciate ligament in his left knee. He subsequently missed the entire 2008–09 season. Smith returned to action in 2009–10, playing in 56 games and averaging 3.4 points and 2.4 rebounds per game.

New Orleans Hornets/Pelicans (2010–2014)
On September 23, 2010, Smith was traded, along with Willie Green, to the New Orleans Hornets in exchange for Darius Songaila and Craig Brackins. On February 1, 2011, he scored a career-high 20 points in a 97–89 win over the Washington Wizards. In 77 games, he averaged 4.3 points and 3.1 rebounds per game.

On December 17, 2011, Smith re-signed with the Hornets to a three-year, $7.5 million contract. He missed over a month of action between February 4 and March 17 due to a concussion suffered on February 4 against the Detroit Pistons. On April 7, 2012, he scored a career-high 26 points in a 99–90 win over the Minnesota Timberwolves. He appeared in 40 games and made 29 starts while averaging a career-high 9.9 points and 4.9 rebounds in the lockout-shortened 2011–12 season.

Smith managed just 51 games in 2012–13 due to a right labrum injury that forced him to miss seven games in December. Smith later missed the final 24 games of the season after having season-ending surgery to repair it. In April 2013, the Hornets were renamed the Pelicans.

In 2013–14, Smith was limited to 31 games due to season-ending knee injury in January 2014.

New York Knicks (2014–2015)
On July 18, 2014, Smith signed a one-year, $3.3 million contract with the New York Knicks. On February 7, 2015, Smith grabbed a season-high 13 rebounds against the Golden State Warriors. On February 11, 2015, Smith scored a season-high 25 points on 10-of-16 shooting in an 89–83 loss to the Orlando Magic. He appeared in all 82 games for the first time in his career and made a career-high 31 starts.

Orlando Magic (2015–2016)
On July 14, 2015, Smith signed a one-year, $4.5 million contract with the Orlando Magic. On March 15, 2016, he set season highs with 25 points and 13 rebounds in a 116–110 win over the Denver Nuggets.

Washington Wizards (2016–2018)

On July 7, 2016, Smith signed a three-year, $16 million contract to the Washington Wizards. He scored a season-high 17 points three times during the 2016–17 season. The 2017–18 season saw Smith appear in just 33 games.

Milwaukee Bucks (2018–2019)
On December 7, 2018, Smith was traded to the Milwaukee Bucks in a five-player, three-team deal.

Return to New Orleans (2019)
On February 7, 2019, Smith was acquired by the New Orleans Pelicans in a three-team trade involving the Bucks and Detroit Pistons. On March 20, 2019, he was waived by the Pelicans after appearing in two games.

Career statistics

NBA

Regular season

|-
| style="text-align:left;"| 
| style="text-align:left;"| Philadelphia
| 76 || 1 || 14.6 || .455 || .286 || .659 || 3.0 || .3 || .3 || .7 || 4.5
|-
| style="text-align:left;"| 
| style="text-align:left;"| Philadelphia
| 56 || 2 || 11.8 || .431 || .345 || .690 || 2.4 || .6 || .4 || .5 || 3.4
|-
| style="text-align:left;"| 
| style="text-align:left;"| New Orleans
| 77 || 6 || 14.3 || .443 || .000 || .843 || 3.1 || .5 || .3 || .4 || 4.3
|-
| style="text-align:left;"| 
| style="text-align:left;"| New Orleans
| 40 || 29 || 23.7 || .520 || .111 || .702 || 4.9 || .9 || .5 || 1.0 || 9.9
|-
| style="text-align:left;"| 
| style="text-align:left;"| New Orleans
| 51 || 0 || 17.2 || .490 || .000 || .843 || 3.6 || .7 || .3 || .9 || 8.2
|-
| style="text-align:left;"| 
| style="text-align:left;"| New Orleans
| 31 || 27 || 26.8 || .465 || – || .780 || 5.8 || .9 || .4 || .9 || 9.7
|-
| style="text-align:left;"| 
| style="text-align:left;"| New York
| 82 || 31 || 21.8 || .434 || .357 || .830 || 4.0 || 1.7 || .4 || .5 || 8.0
|-
| style="text-align:left;"| 
| style="text-align:left;"| Orlando
| 76 || 2 || 15.5 || .485 || .250 || .806 || 2.9 || .8 || .4 || .9 || 7.2
|-
| style="text-align:left;"| 
| style="text-align:left;"| Washington
| 74 || 3 || 14.4 || .529 || .474 || .686 || 3.5 || .5 || .3 || .7 || 5.7
|-
| style="text-align:left;"| 
| style="text-align:left;"| Washington
| 33 || 2 || 8.6 || .391 || .125 || .905 || 1.6 || .4 || .1 || .4 || 3.4
|-
| style="text-align:left;"| 
| style="text-align:left;"| Washington
| 12 || 1 || 10.8 || .405 || .400 || .833 || 3.1 || 1.0 || .1 || .4 || 3.7
|-
| style="text-align:left;"| 
| style="text-align:left;"| Milwaukee
| 6 || 0 || 6.7 || .308 || .333 || 1.000 || 1.8 || .2 || .3 || .3 || 2.2
|-
| style="text-align:left;"| 
| style="text-align:left;"| New Orleans
| 2 || 0 || 10.0 || .222 || .286 || 1.000 || 2.0 || .5 || .0 || .0 || 4.0
|- class="sortbottom"
| style="text-align:center;" colspan="2"| Career
| 616 || 104 || 16.3 || .468 || .333 || .783 || 3.4 || .7 || .3 || .7 || 6.1

Playoffs

|-
| style="text-align:left;"| 2008
| style="text-align:left;"| Philadelphia
| 6 || 0 || 13.7 || .444 || .000 || 1.000 || 2.5 || .5 || .2 || .8 || 3.3
|-
| style="text-align:left;"| 2011
| style="text-align:left;"| New Orleans
| 6 || 0 || 9.7 || .467 || – || – || 1.2 || .2 || .3 || .0 || 2.3
|-
| style="text-align:left;"| 2017
| style="text-align:left;"| Washington
| 13 || 0 || 12.1 || .487 || .300 || .714 || 2.2 || .3 || .2 || .5 || 3.9
|-
| style="text-align:left;"| 2018
| style="text-align:left;"| Washington
| 1 || 0 || 2.0 || – || – || – || .0 || .0 || .0 || .0 || .0
|- class="sortbottom"
| style="text-align:center;" colspan="2"| Career
| 26 || 0 || 11.5 || .472 || .273 || .778 || 2.0 || .3 || .2 || .5 || 3.3

College

|-
| style="text-align:left;"| 2004–05
| style="text-align:left;"| Colorado State
| 26 || 11 || 24.4 || .554 || .250 || .684 || 5.8 || 1.7 || .4 || 1.4 || 10.5
|-
| style="text-align:left;"| 2005–06
| style="text-align:left;"| Colorado State
| 31 || 31 || 28.7 || .517 || .455 || .763 || 7.3 || 2.3 || .6 || 2.1 || 16.2
|-
| style="text-align:left;"| 2006–07
| style="text-align:left;"| Colorado State
| 30 || 28 || 30.2 || .579 || .000 || .770 || 10.1 || 1.9 || .5 || 1.6 || 16.8
|- class="sortbottom"
| style="text-align:center;" colspan="2"| Career
| 87 || 70 || 27.9 || .548 || .308 || .751 || 7.9 || 2.0 || .5 || 1.7 || 14.7

References

External links

Colorado State Rams bio

1986 births
Living people
American men's basketball players
Arkansas RimRockers players
Basketball players from Colorado
Centers (basketball)
Colorado State Rams men's basketball players
Miami Heat draft picks
Philadelphia 76ers players
New Orleans Hornets players
New Orleans Pelicans players
New York Knicks players
Orlando Magic players
Washington Wizards players
Milwaukee Bucks players
People from Greeley, Colorado
Power forwards (basketball)